Alsophila ferdinandii, synonym Cyathea macarthurii, is a fern in the family Cyatheaceae.

Description
The plant is a treefern with a trunk up to 4 m in height, either shaggy with dark frond bases, or clear with round scars. The fronds, growing to 50 cm, have prickly stipes covered with a light brown, woolly indumentum.

Distribution and habitat
The fern is endemic to Australia’s subtropical Lord Howe Island in the Tasman Sea. The commonest tree fern on the island, it is widespread from the lowlands to the mountains.

References

ferdinandii
Endemic flora of Lord Howe Island
Plants described in 1874
Ferns of Australia